Mark Levine (born 1965, New York) is an American poet and non-fiction writer.

He grew up in Toronto, attended Brown University, and the Iowa Writers' Workshop.

He taught at the University of Montana, and at the University of Iowa.  His books of poetry include Capital, Debt, Enola Gay, The Wilds, and Travels of Marco. His book of
non-fiction is titled F5. "Debt" was a selection in the National Poetry Series, and he has been the recipient of a Whiting Award and a fellowship from the National Endowment for the Arts (NEA). He has also written journalism for The New Yorker, the New York Times Magazine and numerous other publications.

Works
 Counting the Forests, Boston Review
 Willow, Poetry Daily

Books
 Debt, Quill/W. Morrow (1993), a selection of the National Poetry Series
 Enola Gay , University of California Press, (April 11, 2000)
 The Wilds, University of California Press, (2006)
 Travels of Marco, Four Way Books (2016)

Ploughshares

References

External links
 Profile at The Whiting Foundation
 
 
 

1965 births
Living people
Iowa Writers' Workshop faculty
Iowa Writers' Workshop alumni
American male poets
Brown University alumni
21st-century American poets
21st-century American male writers